Beryllium (4Be) has 11 known isotopes and 3 known isomers, but only one of these isotopes is stable and a primordial nuclide.  As such, beryllium is considered a monoisotopic element. It is also a mononuclidic element, because its other isotopes have such short half-lives that none are primordial and their abundance is very low (standard atomic weight is ). Beryllium is unique as being the only monoisotopic element with both an even number of protons and an odd number of neutrons. There are 25 other monoisotopic elements but all have odd atomic numbers, and even numbers of neutrons.

All other radioisotopes have half-lives under , most under .

The 1:1 neutron–proton ratio seen in stable isotopes of many light elements (up to oxygen, and in elements with even atomic number up to calcium) is prevented in beryllium by the extreme instability of  toward alpha decay, which is favored due to the extremely tight binding of  nuclei.

Beryllium is prevented from having a stable isotope with 4 protons and 6 neutrons by the very large mismatch in neutron–proton ratio for such a light element. Nevertheless, this isotope, has a half-life of  million years, which indicates unusual stability for a light isotope with such a large neutron/proton imbalance. Other possible beryllium isotopes have even more severe mismatches in neutron and proton number, and thus are even less stable.

Most  in the universe is thought to be formed by cosmic ray nucleosynthesis from cosmic ray spallation in the period between the Big Bang and the formation of the solar system. These two radioisotopes of beryllium in the atmosphere track the sunspot cycle and solar activity, since this affects the magnetic field that shields the Earth from cosmic rays. The rate at which the short-lived  is transferred from the air to the ground is controlled in part by the weather.  decay in the sun is one of the sources of solar neutrinos, and the first type ever detected using the Homestake experiment.

List of isotopes 

|-
| 
|4
|1
| #
|
| p ?
|  ?
| (1/2+)#
|
|
|-
| 
|4
|2
| 
| []
| 2p
| 
| 0+
|
|
|-
| 
|4
|3
| 
| 
| ε
| 
| 3/2−
| Trace
|
|-
| 
|4
|4
| 
| []
| α
| 
| 0+
|
|
|-
| style="text-indent:1em" | 
| colspan="3" style="text-indent:2em" | 
| 
| α
| 
| 2+
|
|
|-
| 
|4
|5
| 
| colspan=3 align=center|Stable
| 3/2−
| 1
|
|-
| style="text-indent:1em" | 
| colspan="3" style="text-indent:2em" | 
| []
| 
| 
| 3/2−
|
|
|-
| 
|4
|6
| 
| 
| β−
| 
| 0+
| Trace
|
|-
| rowspan=3|
| rowspan=3|4
| rowspan=3|7
| rowspan=3|
| rowspan=3|
| β−
| 
| rowspan=3|1/2+
| rowspan=3|
| rowspan=3|
|-
| β−α
| 
|-
| β−p
| 
|-
| style="text-indent:1em" | 
| colspan="3" style="text-indent:2em" | 
| []
| IT ?
|  ?
| 3/2−
|
|
|-
| rowspan=2|
| rowspan=2|4
| rowspan=2|8
| rowspan=2|
| rowspan=2|
| β−
| 
| rowspan=2|0+
| rowspan=2|
| rowspan=2|
|-
| β−n
| 
|-
| style="text-indent:1em" | 
| colspan="3" style="text-indent:2em" | 
| 
| IT
| 
| 0+
|
|
|-
| 
|4
|9
| 
| 
| n ?
|  ?
| (1/2−)
|
|
|-
| style="text-indent:1em" | 
| colspan="3" style="text-indent:2em" | 
| 
| 
| 
| (5/2+)
|
|
|-
| rowspan=5|
| rowspan=5|4
| rowspan=5|10
| rowspan=5|
| rowspan=5|
| β−n
| 
| rowspan=5|0+
| rowspan=5|
| rowspan=5|
|-
| β− (> )
| 
|-
| β−2n
| 
|-
| β−t
| 
|-
| β−α (< )
| 
|-
| style="text-indent:1em" | 
| colspan="3" style="text-indent:2em" | 
| 
| 
| 
| (2+)
|
|
|-
| 
|4
|11
| 
| 
| n
| 
| (5/2+)
|
|
|-
| 
|4
|12
| 
| []
|2n
|
| 0+
|
|

Decay chains
Most isotopes of beryllium within the proton/neutron drip lines decay via beta decay and/or a combination of beta decay and alpha decay or neutron emission. However,  decays only via electron capture, a phenomenon to which its unusually long half-life may be attributed. Notably, its half-life can be artificially lowered by 0.83% via endohedral enclosure (7Be@C60). This alpha decay is often considered fission, which would be able to account for its extremely short half-life.

Notes

References 

 
Beryllium
Beryllium